In quantum physics, Regge theory is the study of the analytic properties of scattering as a function of angular momentum, where the angular momentum is not restricted to be an integer multiple of ħ but is allowed to take any complex value. The nonrelativistic theory was developed by Tullio Regge in 1959.

Details
The energy  of the binding of the electron to the proton is negative whereas for scattering the energy is positive. The formula for the binding energy is the expression
 

Considered as a complex function of  this expression describes in the complex -plane a path which is called a Regge trajectory. Thus in this consideration  the orbital
momentum can assume complex values.

Regge trajectories can be obtained for many other potentials, in particular also for the Yukawa potential.

Regge trajectories appear as poles of the scattering amplitude or in the related  -matrix. In the case of the Coulomb potential considered above this -matrix is given by the following expression as can be checked by reference to any textbook on quantum mechanics:

where  is the gamma function, a generalization of factorial .

History and implications
The main result of the theory is that the scattering amplitude for potential scattering grows as a function of the cosine  of the scattering angle as a power that changes as the scattering energy changes:

where  is the noninteger value of the angular momentum of a would-be bound state with energy . It is determined by solving the radial Schrödinger equation and it smoothly interpolates the energy of wavefunctions with different angular momentum but with the same radial excitation number. The expression  is known as the Regge trajectory function, and when it is an integer, the particles form an actual bound state with this angular momentum. The asymptotic form applies when  is much greater than one, which is not a physical limit in nonrelativistic scattering.

Shortly afterwards, Stanley Mandelstam noted that in relativity the purely formal limit of  large is near to a physical limit — the limit of large . Large  means large energy in the crossed channel, where one of the incoming particles has an energy momentum that makes it an energetic outgoing antiparticle. This observation turned Regge theory from a mathematical curiosity into a physical theory: it demands that the function that determines the falloff rate of the scattering amplitude for particle-particle scattering at large energies is the same as the function that determines the bound state energies for a particle-antiparticle system as a function of angular momentum.

The relation in the crossed channel becomes

It predicts that the function that determines the power law is the same function that interpolates the energies where the resonances appear. The range of angles where scattering can be productively described by Regge theory shrinks into a narrow cone around the beam-line at large energies.

In 1960 Geoffrey Chew and Steven Frautschi conjectured from limited data that the strongly interacting particles had a very simple dependence of the squared-mass on the angular momentum: the particles fall into families where the Regge trajectory functions were straight lines:  with the same constant  for all the trajectories. The straight-line Regge trajectories were later understood as arising from massless endpoints on rotating relativistic strings. Since a Regge description implied that the particles were bound states, Chew and Frautschi concluded that none of the strongly interacting particles were elementary.

Experimentally, the near-beam behavior of scattering did fall off with angle as explained by Regge theory, leading many to accept that the particles in the strong interactions were composite. Much of the scattering was diffractive, meaning that the particles hardly scatter at all — staying close to the beam line after the collision. Vladimir Gribov noted that the Froissart bound combined with the assumption of maximum possible scattering implied there was a Regge trajectory that would lead to logarithmically rising cross sections, a trajectory nowadays known as the pomeron. He went on to formulate a quantitative perturbation theory for near beam line scattering dominated by multi-pomeron exchange.

From the fundamental observation that hadrons are composite, there grew two points of view. Some correctly advocated that there were elementary particles, nowadays called quarks and gluons, which made a quantum field theory in which the hadrons were bound states. Others also correctly believed that it was possible to formulate a theory without elementary particles — where all the particles were bound states lying on Regge trajectories and scatter self-consistently. This was called S-matrix theory.

The most successful S-matrix approach centered on the narrow-resonance approximation, the idea that there is a consistent expansion starting from stable particles on straight-line Regge trajectories. After many false starts,  Richard Dolen, David Horn, and Christoph Schmid understood a crucial property that led Gabriele Veneziano to formulate a self-consistent scattering amplitude, the first string theory. Mandelstam noted that the limit where the Regge trajectories are straight is also the limit where the lifetime of the states is long.

As a fundamental theory of strong interactions at high energies, Regge theory enjoyed a period of interest in the 1960s, but it was largely succeeded by quantum chromodynamics. As a phenomenological theory, it is still an indispensable tool for understanding near-beam line scattering and scattering at very large energies. Modern research focuses both on the connection to perturbation theory and to string theory.

See also

Quark–gluon plasma
Dual resonance model
Pomeron

References

Further reading

External links

Quantum chromodynamics